Calliandra erubescens is a species of flowering plants of the genus Calliandra in the family Fabaceae.

References
Germplasm Resources Information Network: Calliandra 

erubescens